Michael Christopher Malone (November 22, 1942 – August 19, 2022) was an American author and television writer. He was noted for his work on the ABC Daytime drama One Life to Live, as well as for his novels Handling Sin (1983), Foolscap (1991), and the murder mystery First Lady (2002).

Early life
Malone was born in Durham, North Carolina, on November 22, 1942.  His father worked as a psychiatrist; his mother was a teacher who was deaf. His family relocated to Atlanta when he was six years old. He lived with his mother after his parents divorced. He studied English at the University of North Carolina at Chapel Hill, graduating in 1964.  He then obtained a master's degree from that institution two years later. Although he commenced a Doctor of Philosophy in English at Harvard University, he dropped out before finishing his thesis.

Career
Malone's first novel, Painting the Roses Red, was inspired in part by his new wife and released in 1975. He recounted that he had authored the book in order to put off writing his doctoral thesis. He ultimately published 14 novels during his career. One of these, Handling Sin (1983), retold Don Quixote with the Southern United States as its setting. Another book, Foolscap (1991), was about a university professor tasked with authoring an old playwright's biography, while First Lady, published in 2001, recounted a serial killer preying on women in a fictitious North Carolina town and became a bestseller. Malone set many of his stories in Piedmont, including First Lady and the other Justin & Cuddy novels, in his region of North Carolina.

Outside of writing books, Malone became best known for his stint writing the soap opera One Life to Live. He was the serial's head writer after being hired by Linda Gottlieb from 1991 to 1996 and garnered critical acclaim for his storylines, which included a tale involving the tight bond between an ostracized homosexual teenager and a preacher, the creation of villain/rapist Todd Manning and the character's gang rape of Marty Saybrooke, as well as the subsequent rape trial.  Entertainment Weekly wrote that OLTL was "airing some of the most literate drama ever to hit daytime – too good to be called 'soap opera.'"

One Life to Live was averaging 5 million viewers when Malone left in 1996.  His next soap opera writing job was with Another World in 1997. He returned to write One Life to Live from 2003 to 2004.  While writing One Life to Live, Malone wrote a novel called The Killing Club, which was tied into the show.  For months, viewers watched character Marcie Walsh (Kathy Brier) write the book. The book was published in February 2005 with the authors listed as Marcie Walsh and Michael Malone.  To explain this, Marcie said she took the book to "Professor Malone" at Llanview University, who helped her re-write it.  After Malone's departure from the show, Dena Higley continued this storyline, as a copycat killer murdered characters on the show exactly as had occurred in the book. In its first week of publication The Killing Club went to No. 16 on The New York Times Best Seller list for Hardback Fiction.  It later rose to No. 11.

Personal life
Malone was married to Maureen Quilligan, a professor of English at Duke University, for 47 years until his death. They met while he was studying at Harvard.  Together, they had one child (Maggie). They resided in Hillsborough, North Carolina, from 2000, while maintaining a second home in Connecticut. Malone was a board member and a supporter of the Burwell School Historic Site.

Malone died on August 19, 2022, at his home in Clinton, Connecticut.  He was 79, and suffered from pancreatic cancer for over a decade prior to his death.

Writing credits
Another World
Head writer: April 1997 – December 1997 (hired by Charlotte Savitz)
One Life to Live
Head writer: 1991–1996 (hired by Linda Gottlieb); September 2004 – November 24, 2004
Co-head writer: March 10, 2003 – September 2004 (with Josh Griffith)
Story Consultant: February 3, 2003 – March 7, 2003 (hired by Brian Frons)

13 Bourbon Street
TV pilot (co-written with Josh Griffith & produced by Linda Gottlieb)

Publications

Books 
(1975) Painting the Roses Red. New York: Random House. 
(1976) The Delectable Mountains: Or, Entertaining Strangers. Sourcebooks Landmark, .
(1980) Dingley Falls. Sourcebooks Landmark, .
(1983) Handling Sin. Sourcebooks Landmark, .
(1983) Uncivil Seasons. Sourcebooks Landmark, .
(1989) Time's Witness. Sourcebooks Landmark, .
(1991) Foolscap: Or, the Stages of Love. Sourcebooks Landmark, .
(2001) First Lady. Sourcebooks Landmark, .
(2002) Red Clay, Blue Cadillac: Stories of Twelve Southern Women. Sourcebooks Landmark, .
(2002) The Last Noel. Sourcebooks Landmark, .
(2005) The Killing Club. Hyperion, . (co-credited with Marcie Walsh, based on a story by Josh Griffith)
(2009) "The Four Corners Of The Sky" Sourcebooks Landmark

Short stories
"Red Clay" (can be found in Best American Mystery Stories of the Century, published by Houghton Mifflin)
(Recipient of the 1997 Edgar Award for Best Short Story)
"Blue Cadillac"
"Murdered for Love"

Awards
Writers Guild of America Award for Television: Daytime Serials (1992) – One Life to Live
Daytime Emmy Award for Outstanding Drama Series Writing Team (1994) – One Life to Live

References

External links

 
 Review of Malone's short fiction
 DukeUniversityProfile
 IndyWeek: Detailing Malone's Tenure At OLTL
 JanuaryMag
 2003 Return To OLTL
 SheKnows
 SILF Interview

|-

|-

1942 births
2022 deaths
20th-century American male writers
20th-century American novelists
21st-century American male writers
21st-century American novelists
American male novelists
American male screenwriters
American male television writers
American mystery writers
American soap opera writers
Daytime Emmy Award winners
Deaths from cancer in Connecticut
Deaths from pancreatic cancer
Edgar Award winners
Harvard University alumni
Novelists from North Carolina
People from Hillsborough, North Carolina
Screenwriters from North Carolina
Writers from Durham, North Carolina